Peter Blum Edition, is an American fine art print and artist book publisher, located in New York City. Peter Blum Edition was founded by Peter Blum in 1980, where Blum had published numerous books and print editions with artists such as Louise Bourgeois, Alex Katz, and James Turrell, among many others. The Peter Blum print edition projects range from single print to traditional portfolio to installation specific portfolio editions. The book projects are all limited edition and range from artist monographs to historical surveys to special editions that include original prints.

History 
Since 1993, Peter Blum Edition has had gallery space ( as part of Peter Blum SoHo) in New York City.

The Peter Blum Edition Archive has been exhibited twice in museums. The first museum exhibition was titled Singular Multiples: The Peter Blum Edition Archive, 1980-1994 in 2006 at the Museum of Fine Arts, Houston located in Houston, Texas. It has been noted as the largest exhibition in North America devoted entirely to printmaking. On the occasion of this exhibition a book of the same title was published by the museum.

Soon after the exhibition in Houston, a selection of the edition archive was exhibited overseas at the Aargauer Kunsthaus in Aarau, Switzerland in 2007. The exhibition was titled Scenes and Sequences: Peter Blum Edition, New York and was also accompanied by a book of the same title published by the Aargauer Kunsthaus.

Print edition projects 
In chronological order (2011–1981):
 Alex Katz, Nicole, 2011, single print, woodcut print on Yamada Hanga Natural paper, 17 1/8 x 23 3/4 inches (43.5 x 60.3 cm), edition of 30. Printed by Chris Creyts, Temple Terrace, Florida.
 Alex Katz, Reflection II, 2011, single print, 3 color etching on Somerset White paper, 41 x 31 inches (104.1 x 78.4 cm), edition of 30. Printed by Chris Creyts, Temple Terrace, Florida.
 Alex Katz, Bathing Cap (Ada), 2010, single print, woodblock on Somerset White paper, 17 x 22 1/4 inches (43.2 x 56.5 cm), edition of 30. Printed by Chris Creyts, Temple Terrace, Florida.
 Alex Katz, Reflection I, 2010, single print, 3 color etching on Somerset White paper, 18 x 13 inches (47 x 34.3 cm), edition of 45. Printed by Chris Creyts, Temple Terrace, Florida.
 Huma Bhabha, Untitled, 2010, single print, woodcut over lithograph on Somerset Soft White paper, 38 x 26 inches (97.8 x 66 cm), edition of 25. Printed by Maurice Sanchez, Derrière L'Etoile Studios, New York.
 Adrian Paci, She, 2008, portfolio, 16 etchings, soft-ground, hard-ground, aquatint, and spitbite printed on Hahnemühle paper, 17 x 13 inches (43.2 x 33 cm), edition of 35. Printed by Lower East Side Printshop, New York. This portfolio also contains the poem Lokja by Ndre Mjeda, translated from Albanian by Robert Elsie and Janice Mathei-Heck.
 Matthew Day Jackson, Bucky (ROYBGV) from the Dymaxion Series, 2007, single print, intaglio, soft-ground, spitbite, and screenprint on Hahnemühle Copperplate paper, 23 x 17 inches (60.3 x 44.5 cm), edition of 35. Printed by Lower East Side Printshop, New York.
 Matthew Day Jackson, Das Wochenendhaus from the Dymaxion Series, 2007, print installation, 16 prints in intaglio, archival inkjet, screenprint, lithograph, and c-print on Hahnemühle Copperplate paper and Durotone Newsprint Ages paper, overall installation dimensions: 82 x 111 1/2 inches (208 x 283 cm), edition of 35, Printed by Lower East Side Printshop, New York.
 Matthew Day Jackson, Missing Link (Lady Liberty) from The Dymaxion Series, 2007, print installation, 3 prints in screenprint, collage, intaglio etching, aquatint, spitbite, and hand painting on found poster laminated on Coventry Rag paper and Hahnemühle Copperplate paper, 60 x 72 inches (152.4 x 182.9 cm), edition of 35. Printed by Lower East Side Printshop, New York.
 Huma Bhabha, Reconstructions, 2007, portfolio, 2 woodblock prints and 16 photogravures on Tosa Hanga and Hahnemühle Bütten papers, woodblock prints: 25 x 34 inches (64.5 x 96.5 cm), photogravures: 29 x 36 5/8 inches (75 x 93 cm), edition of 35. Woodblock prints printed by Maurice Sanchez, Derrière L'Etoile Studios, New York. Photogravures printed by Niels Borch Jensen, Copenhagen, Denmark.
 Alfredo Jaar, The Sound of Silence, 2006, portfolio, 15 pigment prints on Angelica paper, 20 x 30 inches (50.8 x 76.2 cm), edition of 25. Printed by Laumont Editions, New York.
 Louise Bourgeois, Ode à l'Oubli, 2004, hand-made cloth book, 36 pages, fabric lithographic ink and archival dyes on cloth, 10 x 13 inches (27 x 34 cm), edition of 25. Produced by Solo Impression, New York and Dye-Namix Inc., New York.
 KimSooja, Seven Wishes, 2004, portfolio, 7 iris prints on Somerset Velvet paper, 45 x 31 inches (114.3 x 80.6 cm), edition of 20. Printed by Pamplemousse Press, New York.
 Alex Katz, Pines, 2003, single print, linocut on Okawara paper, 27 5/8 x 33 inches (70.2 x 84.5 cm), edition of 30. Printed by Chris Erickson, Brooklyn, New York.
 Alex Katz, Primus Inter Pares, 2003, book, 48 page count printed on Zerkall paper, 10 x 14 inches (25.4 x 35.5 cm), edition of 50. Printed by Mark Chromister Design, hand bound by Judi Conant, and produced under the direction of Jerry Kelly. Accompanied with a poem by Kenneth Koch. Contains original drawings by Alex Katz.
 Alex Katz, Impatiens, 2001, single print, linocut on Okawara paper, 54 x 36 inches (137.2 x 95 cm), edition of 35. Printed by John C. Erickson, Brooklyn, New York.
 Alex Katz, Landscape, 2001, portfolio, 8 linocuts on Stonehenge paper, 16 x 13 7/8 inches (42.5 x 35.2 cm), edition of 45. Printed by John C. Erickson, Brooklyn, New York.
 Tacita Dean, The Russian Ending, 2001, portfolio, 20 photogravure etchings on Hahnemühle paper, 21 x 31 inches (54 x 79.4 cm), edition of 35. Printed by Niels Borch Jensen, Copenhagen, Denmark.
 Alex Katz, Untitled (Cloud), 2001, single print, linocut on Somerset paper, 16 x 14 inches (42.5 x 35.6 cm), edition of 45. Printed by John C. Erickson, Brooklyn, New York.
 Alex Katz, Untitled (House), 2001, single print, linocut on Somerset paper, 16 x 14 inches (42.5 x 35.6 cm), edition of 45. Printed by John C. Erickson, Brooklyn, New York.
 Alex Katz, Untitled (Tree), 2001, single print, linocut on Somerset paper, 16 x 14 inches (42.5 x 35.6 cm), edition of 45. Printed by John C. Erickson, Brooklyn, New York.
 Alex Katz, Untitled (Yellow Road), 2001, single print, linocut on Somerset paper, 16 x 14 inches (42.5 x 35.6 cm), edition of 45. Printed by John C. Erickson, Brooklyn, New York.
 Helmut Federle, Blue Sisters, Structures of Deviance, 1999, portfolio, 5 heliogravures & 5 etchings on Zerkall paper, 27.5 x 25 inches (70 x 62.5 cm), edition of 35. Printed by Druckatelier Kurt Zein, Vienna, Austria.
 Robert Zandvliet, The Varick Series, 1999, single prints, 32 monotypes on Arches Cover paper, varying dimensions, approx. 40 x 79 inches (102 x 201 cm). Printed by Maurice Sanchez at Derrière L'Etoile Studios, New York.
 Alex Katz, Edges, 1997, portfolio, 13 etchings on Rives Heavyweight paper, 15 x 12 inches (38 x 32 cm), edition of 30. Printed by Simmelink/Sukimoto Editions, Marina del Rey, California. Letterpress by Carol Sturm of Nadja, Accord, New York.
 Yukinori Yanagi, Wandering Position, 1997, portfolio, 5 line etchings on Somerset Soft White Textured paper, 24 x 20 inches (61.5 x 51 cm), edition of 35. Printed by Harlan and Weaver, Inc., New York.
 Luc Tuymans, The Temple, 1996, portfolio, 8 engravings and aquatint on Rives paper, 31 x 23 inches (80 x 60.5 cm), edition of 35. Printed by Peter Kneubühler, Zürich, Switzerland.
 Louise Bourgeois, The View from the Bottom of the Well, 1996, portfolio, 9 etchings, drypoint, and aquatint on Somerset Soft White paper, 13 x 10 inches (33 x 26.5 cm), edition of 25. Printed by Harlan and Weaver, Inc., New York. Includes a text by Louise Bourgeois.
 Yukinori Yanagi, Chrysanthemum and Sword, 1995, single print, photo-silkscreen on canvas, 34 x 25 1/8 inches (87 x 63.8 cm), edition of 12. Printed by Maurice Sanchez at Derrière L'Etoile Studios, New York.
 Louise Bourgeois, Spider, 1995, single print, drypoint on Hahnemühle paper, 21 x 15 7/8 inches (54 x 40.3 cm), edition of 35. Printed by Harlan and Weaver, Inc., New York.
 Simon Frost, Untitled, 1995, single print, etching (drypoint engraving) on Somerset paper, 30 x 75 9/16 inches (101 x 191.9 cm), edition of 12. Printed by Simmelink/Sukimoto Editions, Highland, New York.
 Louise Bourgeois, Autobiographical Series, 1994, portfolio, 14 etchings (drypoint and aquatint) on Somerset paper, varying dimensions, edition of 35. Printed by Harlan and Weaver, Inc., New York.
 Louise Bourgeois, Champfleurette, the White Cat, 1994, single print, etching, drypoint, and aquatint on Somerset Satin paper, 18 x 25 inches (47 x 63.5 cm), edition of 22. Printed by Harlan and Weaver, Inc., New York.
 Louise Bourgeois, Dismemberment, 1994, single print, etching, drypoint, and roulette on Somerset Soft White paper, 20 x 15 inches (52 x 38 cm), edition of 44. Printed by Harlan and Weaver, Inc., New York.
 Thomas Ruff, Nacht, Blossfeldt, 1994, single print, color photograph, 8 x 8 inches (20 x 20 cm), edition of 35.
 Louise Bourgeois, Stamp of Memories II, 1994, single print, drypoint and metal stamp on Somerset Soft White paper, 25 5/8 x 17 inches (65 x 43.7 cm), edition of 15. Printed by Harlan and Weaver, Inc., New York.
 Louise Bourgeois, Triptych for the Red Room, 1994, triptych, aquatint, drypoint, and engraving on Hahnemühle paper, installation dimensions: 27 x 111 inches (71 x 281.9 cm), edition of 30. Printed by Harlan and Weaver, Inc., New York.
 Louise Bourgeois, Arched Figure, 1993, single print, drypoint on Arches paper, 15 5/8 x 22 inches (39.5 x 56 cm), edition of 50. Printed by Harlan and Weaver, Inc., New York.
 David Rabinowitch, Birth of Constructivisim: Sequence for Vertov I-VII, 1993, portfolio, 7 etchings, aquatint, and soft-ground spit-bite on Somerset Satin paper, 35 x 24 inches (91 x 61 cm), edition of 30. Printed by Harlan and Weaver, Inc., New York.
 Louise Bourgeois, Stamp of Memories I, 1993, single print, drypoint and metal stamp on Somerset Soft White paper, 25 5/8 x 17 inches (65 x 43.7 cm), edition of 30. Printed by Harlan and Weaver, Inc., New York.
 Louise Bourgeois, Homely Girl, A Life, 1992, portfolio, 10 etchings in drypoint on Somerset Soft White paper, 21 x 15 inches (52 x 38 cm), edition of 44. Printed by Harlan and Weaver, Inc., New York.
 Louise Bourgeois, Sainte Sebastienne, 1992, single print, drypoint on Somerset Satin paper, 47 x 37 inches (120.5 x 94 cm), edition of 50. Printed by Harlan and Weaver, Inc., New York.
 David Rabinowitch, The Collinasca Cycle, 1992, portfolio, 12 wood block prints on handmade Kumohada Mashi paper, 78 x 31 inches (200 x 80 cm), edition of 20. Printed by Francois Lafranca, Verscio, Switzerland.
 Yukinori Yanagi, Hinomaru, 1991, portfolio, 5 lithographs in colors and 1 embossed print with collage, 33 x 24 inches (84 x 31 cm), edition of 35. Printed by Maurice Sanchez at Derrière L'Etoile Studios, New York.
 Rosemarie Trockel, White Carrot, 1991, portfolio, 10 photoetchings with embossing printed in buff and white, each with drop-in photoetching plates printed in black, 1 gelatin silver photograph, and 1 porcelain object, etchings: 21 x 14 7/8 inches (54 x 37.7 cm), photo: 9 x 7 1/8 inches (24 x 18 cm), object: 20 5/8 x 2 5/8 x 1 3/8 inches (52.4 x 6.7 x 3.5 cm), edition of 35. Printed by Peter Kneubühler, Zürich, Switzerland.
 Helmut Federle, 5+1, 1989, 6 etchings, aquatint, line etching, and soft-ground on Zerkall paper, 29 x 21 1/8 inches (75 x 53.5 cm), edition of 35. Printed by Druckatelier Kurt Zein, Vienna, Austria.
 Louise Bourgeois, Anatomy, 1989, portfolio, 11 drypoint etchings on Somerset Soft White paper and one multiple object, 10 etchings: 19 x 14 inches (49.5 x 35.5 cm), multiple object: 11 x 8 inches (28 x 21.5 cm), edition of 44. Etchings printed by Harlan and Weaver, Inc., New York. Multiple produced by Solo Press Inc., New York.
 James Turrell, First Light, 1989, portfolio, 20 etchings and aquatint on Zerkall paper, 42 x 29 inches (107.3 x 75.5 cm), edition of 30. Printed by Peter Kneubühler, Zürich.
 Terry Winters, Furrows, 1989, portfolio, 5 woodcuts in mahogany and oak on Handmade Lafranca paper, 27 x 21 inches (68.5 x 54 cm), edition of 45. Printed by Francois Lafranca, Verscio, Switzerland.
 Sherrie Levine, Meltdown, 1989, portfolio, 4 color woodcuts on Korean Kozo paper, 36 x 25 inches (92.5 x 65.5 cm), edition of 35. Printed by Maurice Sanchez at Derrière L'Etoile Studios, New York.
 Louise Bourgeois, To Hide, 1989, single print, drypoint etching on Somerset Soft White paper, 19 x 14 inches (49.5 x 35.5 cm), edition of 44. Printed by Harlan and Weaver, Inc., New York.
 Louise Bourgeois, Untitled, 1989, single print, drypoint etching on Somerset Soft White paper, 19 x 22 inches (49 x 56 cm), edition of 50. Printed by Harlan and Weaver, Inc., New York.
 Alex Katz, 3 PM, 1988, single print, woodcut on Dove Grey Archivart paper, 36 x 72 inches (93.5 x 182 cm), edition of 50. Printed by John C. Erickson, New York.
 John Baldessari, Heaven and Hell, 1988, diptych, color etchings, aquatint, scraping, roulette, and photo-etching on Rives BFK paper, 47 x 31 inches (120 x 80 cm), edition of 45. Printed by Peter Kneubühler, Zürich.
 General Idea, Fear Management, 1987, portfolio, 8 silkscreen prints on Rives BFK paper, 33 x 22 inches (84 x 56 cm), edition of 50. Each sheet hand-painted by Winston Roeth and printed by Sheila Marbain, Maurel Studios, New York.
 James Turrell, Mapping Spaces, 1987, portfolio, 5 etchings, aquatint, photoetching, drypoint, and soft-ground on Hahnemühle paper, 22 x 30 inches (56 x 78 cm), edition of 35. Printed by Peter Kneubühler, Zürich, Switzerland.
 Alex Katz, A Tremor in the Morning, 1986, portfolio, 10 woodcuts on Rives BFK paper, 20 x 20 inches (52 x 51 cm), edition of 45. Printed by Chip Elwell, New York.
 Brice Marden, Etchings to Rexroth, 1986, portfolio, 25 etchings, sugar lift, aquatint, open bite, drypoint, and scraping prints, 19 x 16 inches (50 x 41 cm), edition of 45. Printed by Jennifer Melby, New York.
 Enzo Cucchi, L'Elefante di Giotto, 1986, single print, aquatint and drypoint on Fabriano paper, 54 x 120 inches (138 x 255 cm), edition of 45. Printed by Valter Rossi, 2RC, Rome, Italy.
 Josef Felix Müller, Tasten durch den Feinen Nebel der Sinnlichkeit (Groping through the Fine Mist of Sensuousness), 1986, portfolio, 4 woodcuts, varying dimensions, edition of 5. Printed by Urban Stoob, St. Gallen, Switzerland.
 Eric Fischl, Floating Islands, 1985, portfolio, 5 color etchings, aquatint, sugar-lift, drypoint and scraping on Zerkall paper, varying dimensions, edition of 45. Printed by Peter Kneubühler, Zürich, Switzerland.
 Jonathan Borofsky, 2740475, 1982, portfolio, 6 drypoint etchings and 7 silkscreens on Velin d'Arches paper, 30 x 22 inches (76 x 56 cm), edition of 50. Etchings printed by Robert Aull and Leslie Sutcliffe, Los Angeles. Silkscreens printed by H.M. Büchi, Basel, Switzerland.
 John Baldessari, Black Dice, 1982, portfolio, 9 color etchings, photoetching, aquatint, soft-ground etching, and sugar-lift aquatint, and 1 black and white photograph on Velin d'Arches paper, etchings: 16 x 19 inches (42 x 50 cm), photograph: 8 x 9 1/8 inches (20.3 x 23.2 cm), edition of 35. Printed by Peter Kneubühler, Zürich, Switzerland.
 Francesco Clemente, Febbre Alta (High Fever), 1982, portfolio, 8 woodcuts on Handmade Lafranca paper, 26 x 21 inches (68 x 54 cm), edition of 35. Printed by Francois Lafranca, Verscio, Switzerland.
 Enzo Cucchi, Un'immagine oscura (An Obscure Image), 1982, single print, etching, sugar-lift aquatint and drypoint with screenprint in colors on Fabriano Rosaspina paper, 47 x 69 inches (120 x 176 cm), edition of 30. Printed by Valter Rossi, Vigna Antoniniana Stamperia d'Arte, Rome, Italy.
 A.R. Penck, 8 Erfahrungen (8 Experiences), 1981, portfolio, 8 woodcuts on Handmade Lafranca paper, 31 x 23 inches (80 x 60 cm), edition of 50. Printed by Francois Lafranca, Verscio, Switzerland.
 Martin Disler, Endless Modern Licking of Crashing Globe by Black Doggie Time-Bomb, 1981, portfolio, 8 etchings, aquatint, soft and hard ground, sugar lift, drypoint, photoetching, roulette, and scraping on Van Gelder paper, 22 x 30 inches (56 x 76 cm), edition of 49. Printed by Aeropress, Inc., New York.
 Enzo Cucchi, Immagine Feroce, 1981, portfolio, 5 lithographs in colors on Fabriano Rosaspina paper, 25 x 18 inches (64 x 48 cm), edition of 50. Printed by 2 RC Stamperia d'Arte, Rome, Italy.
 Sandro Chia, Manuale d'Aprile, 1981, portfolio, 5 color etchings, aquatint, drypoint, roulette, scraping, and open-bite on Arches Buff paper, 30 x 22 inches (76 x 56 cm), edition of 50. Printed by Aeropress Inc., New York.
 Rolf Winnewisser, Non-Territory Maps of a Strange Loop Between Visiting and Staying in a Picture, 1981, portfolio, 4 color and 7 black & white linocuts on Yamato paper, 25 x 38 inches (63.5 x 96.5 cm), edition of 25. Printed by Solo Press Inc., New York.

Book projects 
In chronological order (2015–1984):
 Zurier, John. John Zurier: Paintings 1981-2014. New York: Peter Blum Edition, 2015. Edition of 1,000. With an essay by Robert Storr and foreword by Lawrence Rinder.
 Kläs, Esther. Not Now. New York: Peter Blum Edition, 2014. Edition of 500.
 Federle, Helmut. The Ferner Paintings. New York: Peter Blum Edition, 2013. Edition of 1,200. With an essay by Erich Franz in German and English.
 Beech, John. The Space Surrounding. New York: Peter Blum Edition, 2012. Edition of 1,000.
 Jackson, Matthew Day. The Tomb, In Search of. New York: Peter Blum Edition, 2011. 2 volumes. Edition of 800. With text by Benno Tempel.
 Marker, Chris. PASSENGERS. New York: Peter Blum Edition, 2011. Edition of 2,000. With text by Chris Marker.
 Kindred Spirits: Native American Influences on 20th Century Art. New York: Peter Blum Edition, 2011. With texts by Carter Ratcliff and Paul Chaat Smith.
 Bhabha, Huma. Huma Bhabha. New York: Peter Blum Edition & Salon 94, 2010. Edition of 1,500. With text by Thomas McEvilley interview with Huma Bhabha by Julie Mehretu.
 Rabinowitch, David. Birth of Romanticism Drawings. New York: Peter Blum Edition, Zürich: Annemarie Verna Edition, Düsseldorf: Richter Verlag, 2010. Edition of 800. With text by Erich Franz in English and German.
 Tse, Su-Mei. Notes. New York: Peter Blum Edition, 2010. Special edition of 100. Includes original drawing by the artist.
 Beech, John and Edward Albee. Obscure/Reveal. New York: Peter Blum Edition, 2008. Edition of 700.
 Ryman, Robert. Works on Paper 1957-1964. New York: Peter Blum Edition, 2004. Edition of 2,000. Includes an interview with Robert Ryman by Peter Blum (gallerist & publisher).
 Katz, Alex. First Sight. New York: Peter Blum Edition, 2004. Edition of 800. With text by Jean-Christophe Ammann in English and German.
 Rabinowitch, David. Carved Woodblock Monotypes 1962. New York: Peter Blum Edition, 2003. Edition of 1,500. With text by Kenneth Baker in English and German.
 Katz, Alex. The Woodcuts and Linocuts. New York: Peter Blum Edition, 2001. Edition of 1,500. With introduction by Merlin James.
 Zandvliet, Robert. The Varick Series. New York: Peter Blum Edition, 2000. Edition of 1,300. With text by Vincent Katz. Poems by Elaine Equi and Vincent Katz.
 Bloom, Barbara and Christian Marclay. The French Diplomat's Office. New York: Peter Blum Edition, 1999. Edition of 250. Note: this is a compact disc recording by Barbara Bloom in collaboration with artist and composer Christian Marclay.
 Katz, Alex and Robert Creeley. Edges. New York: Peter Blum Edition, 1999. Edition of 1,500. With text by Merlin James.
 Taaffe, Philip. Composite Nature. New York: Peter Blum Edition, 1998. Edition of 2,000. With a transcribed conversation between Philip Taaffe and filmmaker Stan Brakhage.
 Herzog & de Meuron. Zeichnungen Drawings. New York: Peter Blum Edition, 1997. Edition of 2,000. With text by Theodora Vischer in English and German.
 In Quest of the Absolute. New York: Peter Blum Edition, 1996. Edition of 2,000. With text by Erich Franz in English and German.
 Bourgeois, Louise. Album. New York: Peter Blum Edition, 1994. Edition of 850.
 Herzog & de Meuron. Architectures of Herzog & de Meuron, Portraits by Thomas Ruff. New York: Peter Blum Edition, 1994. Printed in two editions. With introduction by Terence Riley and texts by Steven Holl, Hans Kollhoff, Rem Koolhass, Eduardo Souto de Moura and Theodora Vischer.
 Rabinowitch, David. The Collinasca Cycle. New York: Peter Blum Edition, 1993. Edition of 600.
 Bourgeois, Louise and Arthur Miller. Homely Girl, A Life. New York: Peter Blum Edition, 1992. 2 volumes. Edition of 1,200.
 Federle, Helmut. 5+1. New York: Peter Blum Edition, 1990. Edition of 700. With texts in German and English by Eva Badura-Triska, Erich Franz, Dieter Koepplin, Donald Kuspit, Friedrich Meschede and Theodora Vischer.
 Horn, Roni. To Place Bluff Life. New York: Peter Blum Edition, 1990. Edition of 1,000.
 Fischl, Eric. Scenes and Sequences. New York: Peter Blum Edition, 1989. Edition of 1,600. With text by E.L. Doctorow.
 Marden, Brice. Tu Fu, Kenneth Rexroth, Brice Marden. New York: Peter Blum Edition, 1987. Edition of 800. With poems by 8th century Chinese Poet Tu Fu with translations by Kenneth Rexroth.
 Cucchi, Enzo. Sparire (Disappearing). New York: Peter Blum Edition, 1987. Edition of 1,500. With text by Bice Curiger in English and German.
 Turrell, James. Mapping Spaces: A Topological Survey of the Work by James Turrell. New York: Peter Blum Edition, 1987. Edition of 1,200. With introduction by Jean-Christophe Ammann and texts by Craig Adcock, Mario Diacono, E.C. Krupp, and James Turrell.
 Katz, Alex and Vincent Katz. A Tremor in the Morning. New York: Peter Blum Edition, 1986. Edition of 350.
 Diacono, Mario and James Turrell. Iconographia Coelestis. New York: Peter Blum Edition, 1985. Edition of 150. With a poem by Pablo Neruda.
 Cucchi, Enzo. La Ceremonia delle Cose (The Ceremony of Things). New York: Peter Blum Edition, 1985. With texts by Enzo Cucchi in Italian and English, and texts in Italian and English collected by Mario Diacono.
 Stalder, Anselm. Der Umfang des Fassungsvermögens (The Limits of Perception). New York: Peter Blum Edition, 1984. Edition of 545.
 Curiger, Bice. Looks et tenebrae. New York: Peter Blum Edition, 1984. Edition of 294. With essay by Jean-Christophe Ammann in German and English.

References 

Book publishing companies based in New York (state)